The Review of Economics and Statistics is a peer-reviewed general journal that focuses on applied economics, with specific relevance to the scope of quantitative economics. The Review, edited at the Harvard University’s Kennedy School of Government (JSTOR), has the long-term aim of publishing influential articles in mainly theoretical and empirical economics that will contribute to the broader readership in economics in both the present and the continual future.

Over the time, the journal has published several of the most significant articles in empirical economics (JSTOR) based on its recognizable history which includes works from “Kenneth Arrow, Milton Friedman, Robert Merton, Paul Samuelson, Robert Solow, and James Tobin” (MIT Press Direct). Occasionally, the Review also publishes a series of papers of collections of symposia dedicated to a particular topic of “methodological or empirical” interest (JSTOR).

History 
The journal, founded initially as The Review of Economic Statistics at Harvard University in 1917, published its official “inaugural volume” in 1919 and was edited at the Harvard Kennedy School in 2002. The title of the journal changed to the Review of Economics and Statistics in 1948, explicitly starting from issue 30:1 (MIT Press Direct, “The Review of Economics and Statistics Celebrates 100 Years”).

As the first editor-in-chief of the Review, Charles J. Bullock has remarked in his Prefatory Statement to the first issue that “the purpose of the Review is to promote the collection, criticism, and interpretation of economic statistics, with a view to making them more accurate and valuable than they are at present for business and scientific purposes.” (Bullock)

Editors 
Editors of the Review of Economics and Statistics are divided as members of the editorial board and other associate editors. General editors are responsible of processing and evaluating submitted review papers from reviewers, with the authority to either publish or reject them, or alternatively forward arguable reviews to editors on the board for clarification (ASHA Journals).

One of the past editors of the Review, Ambitabh Chandra, in an interview with the American Society of Health Economics (ASHEcon) provided his expertise on the journal’s process of evaluating submitted reviews, and specific suggestions of improvements for reviewers from his perspectives. In particular, he addressed

Editorial Board 
Members of the Review’s editorial board are selected by all editors, including the publishers. They are a team with critical expertise on refining submitted content and promoting the journal to their fellow peers for the expansion of readership. The board generally goes through a total revision of members “every two or three years” (Elsevier).  

Below is a list of the current 2022 editors on the editorial board of the Review of Economics and Statistics:

 Pierre Azoulay, MIT
 Olivier Coibion, University of Texas, Austin
 Will Dobbie (Co-Chair), Harvard University
 Raymond Fisman (Co-Chair), Boston University
 Benjamin R. Handel, University of California, Berkeley
 Brian A. Jacob, University of Michigan
 Kareen Rozen, Brown University
 Xiaoxia Shi, University of Wisconsin-Madison
 Tavneet Suri, MIT
 Yi (Daniel) Xu, Duke University (MIT Press Direct)

Past editors since 1919 
Below is a list of past editors on the Review of Economics and Statistics editorial board since the journal was first founded in 1919. Published in December 2018 (Volume 100, Issue 5) as a celebration of the journal’s 100th issue, MIT Press created the list in recognition and appreciation of the effort and contribution that all editors put in for the growth and continuation of the journal (The MIT Press). 

Despite the general editorial duties, recently retired editors such as Asim I. Khwaja had been actively participating in the writing and editing of the “Review of Economics and Statistics over the Past 100 Years”, which is a journal article issued in October 2018 that investigated the changes and transformations that the Review experienced through the 100 years, providing a detailed summary of the Review’s overall evolution (Khwaja and Mangal).

Volumes & Issues 
Comment on the change in the number of issues à from 4 to 5, insert tables to demonstrate

Volume – 1 volume per year

Notable papers

Most read

Most cited

Impacts 
Refer to the impacts measures from various website

Submission Guidelines

Subscriptions 
To become a subscriber of the Review journal, there are several options listed on the MIT Press website that outlines the pricing for both paperback and electronic version. Subscribing at a discounted rate, for example, at the Student rate requires proof and verification of relevant student status through the Press’ Student Portal before the beginning of shipping of subscription.

Note that prices are subject to change without notice beforehand, and subscriptions are entered for the volume year only. It is also required that all orders must be accompanied by payment via credit card (MasterCard, VISA, or American Express), check (must be drawn against U.S. bank in U.S. funds), or money order (cite MIT PRESS).

Subscribe/Renew Options 

Subscriptions purchased for personal use only including those at the individual, student, and retired rates is strictly prohibited from reselling.

Single Issues

Package Orders

Release schedule (2020-2022) 
The release dates scheduled by the MIT Press Journals refer to the planned release of e-only and open access titles and the mailing dates of the printed journals for the Review. These dates are “subject to change” and only act as a reference (MIT Press Direct). 

Note that although the shipping has been resumed up until now, since MIT Press Journals “paused the distribution of printed journals” between “April 21 and September 2, 2020”, the actual mail date is reflected below as the Release Date (MIT Press Direct).

The latest list of scheduled release dates below includes dates after the printed editions are resumed to release:

References

External links 
 

Econometrics journals
English-language journals
Harvard University academic journals
MIT Press academic journals
Publications established in 1919
5 times per year journals